The 1991 NCAA Division I Women's Lacrosse Championship was the 10th annual single-elimination tournament to determine the national championship of Division I NCAA women's college lacrosse. The championship game was played at Lions Stadium in Trenton, New Jersey during May 1991.  All NCAA Division I women's lacrosse programs were eligible for this championship. A total of 6 teams were invited to participate.

The Virginia Cavaliers won their first championship by defeating the Maryland Terrapins in the final, 8–6. 

The leading scorer for the tournament, with 10 goals, was Jenny Slingluff from Virginia. The Most Outstanding Player trophy was not awarded this year.

Teams

Tournament bracket

Tournament outstanding players 
Mandy Stevenson, Maryland
Michele Uhlfelder, Maryland
Kierstin Coppola, New Hampshire
Karen Hoysted, Penn State
Robyn Nye, Virginia
Jenny Slingluff, Virginia

See also 
 NCAA Division I Women's Lacrosse Championship
 NCAA Division III Women's Lacrosse Championship
 1991 NCAA Division I Men's Lacrosse Championship

References

NCAA Division I Women's Lacrosse Championship
NCAA Division I Women's Lacrosse Championship
NCAA Women's Lacrosse Championship